The Port au Bras Formation is a formation cropping out in Newfoundland.

References

Geology of Newfoundland and Labrador
Volcanism of Newfoundland and Labrador